Gene Lyle Hoffman (September 8, 1912 – October 10, 1998) was an American politician and World War II veteran from the state of Iowa.

Hoffman was born in Lamoni, Iowa in 1912. He received his education in Lamoni. Hoffman served as a Democrat in the Iowa Senate from 1957 to 1961. He died in 1998 and was interred in Rose Hill Cemetery in Lamoni, Iowa.

References

1912 births
1998 deaths
Iowa Democrats